The 2020 IHF Women's Olympic Qualification Tournaments were held from 19 to 21 March 2021, in Spain, Hungary and Montenegro. Four teams took part in each tournament, with the two best-ranked teams qualifying for Tokyo 2020.

On 13 March 2020, the IHF postponed the tournaments due to the COVID-19 pandemic. Previously, the tournaments were scheduled to take place from 20 to 22 March 2020. The tournaments were rescheduled for 19 to 21 March 2021.

Format
There were three Olympic Qualification Tournaments. Only twelve teams that have not yet qualified through the five events mentioned above could play in the tournament:

The top six teams from the 2019 World Championship that did not already qualify through their continental championships are eligible to participate in the tournament.
The best ranked teams of each continent in the 2019 World Championship represent the continent in order to determine the continental ranking. The first ranked continent received two more places for the tournament. The second, third and fourth ranked continent received one place each. The last place belongs to a team from Oceania, if one was ranked between 8th–12th at the World Championship. If no team from Oceania met this condition, the second ranked continent receives an extra place instead. The teams that already earned their places through their World Championship ranking will not be considered for receiving places through the continental criterion.
The twelve teams were allocated in three pools of four teams according to the table below. The top two teams from each pool qualified for the 2020 Olympic Games.

On 10 January 2020, North Korea withdrew and was replaced by Kazakhstan.

On 3 February 2020, China and Hong Kong withdrew and were replaced by Thailand. In October 2020, China requested to be reinstated because the tournaments were moved and the IHF granted that request. On 1 March 2021, China withdrew from the tournament due to COVID-19 travel restrictions. Because of that, Kazakhstan was moved to Tournament 2 and no other Asian team was available (Hong Kong declined a participation and Thailand did not respond prior to the deadline), meaning that Tournament 3 will be played with three teams. Senegal withdrew on 9 March 2021 and was not replaced by another African team.

Referees
The referees were announced on 25 February 2021.

Tournament 1

Standings

All times are local (UTC+1).

Matches

Tournament 2

Standings

All times are local (UTC+1).

Matches

Tournament 3

Standings

All times are local (UTC+1).

Matches

See also
2020 IHF Men's Olympic Qualification Tournaments

References

External links
IHF website

Women's qualification tournaments
Handball Women tournaments
Olympics tournaments
Impact of the COVID-19 pandemic on the 2020 Summer Olympics
March 2021 sports events in Europe
IHF
IHF
IHF
2021 in women's handball